The black screen of death is a fatal system error displayed by some versions of the Microsoft Windows operating system after encountering a critical system error.

Windows 3.x

In Windows 3.x the black screen of death is the behavior that occurred when a DOS-based application failed to execute properly. It was often known to occur in connection with attempting certain operations while networking drivers were resident in memory. (Commonly, but not exclusively, it was seen while the Novell NetWare client for DOS, NETX, was loaded.).

The issue was fixed in most instances by adding an additional section in the SYSTEM.INI of affected clients with the text TimerCriticalSection = 10000. The following files were also updated, vtdapi.386re.386 and vipx.38id-1991 by Ed Brown, a technician with the Coca-Cola Company's IT department in Atlanta, GA. He reports that the company was rolling out Windows 3.0 within the Global Marketing group and when the users would attempt to run WordPerfect, they would receive a black screen. This is also just a black screen.

Later versions of Windows 
MS-DOS, Windows 95, Windows 98, Windows 2000, Windows Me, Windows XP, Windows Vista, Windows 7, and Windows 8 also display a Black Screen of Death when the operating system cannot boot.  There are many different causes for this complex problem and each cause requires a different solution. The failure is sometimes caused by a missing file. This malfunction also occurs when the user enables file compression on all files and the operating system compresses. Rarely must the user reinstall Windows. If the operating system is compressed, it will not be able to boot, even into safe mode. However, booting from another device and uncompressing the files will usually solve the issue.

In late 2009, several new reports of the Black Screen of Death in Windows XP, Windows Vista, and Windows 7 emerged. At first several claims pointed at a Windows Update. It was later recanted by Prevx as an erroneous report. Microsoft reported that no security update was causing the issue, and it may be tied to malware. In other cases, the black screen was replaced with the blue screen of death. The Black Screen of Death may also be caused by certain components of a computer overheating, in place of the traditional blue screen, that appeared to indicate a Stop error. This black screen was simplified compared to the previous blue screen, omitting instructions that the user is recommended to take.

Windows 10 also displays a black screen of death due to an unfinished update in addition to the aforementioned causes above; in the former case, the system restarts after the update and the user is presented with the login screen, however after logging in the user is stuck with another black screen instead. Performing a hard-shutdown of the computer and cold-booting it is the only way for the user to resolve this problem.

macOS 
In some versions of macOS (such as OS X Lion), a hardware or software issue could cause the system to display a black screen of death instead of a kernel panic. This is usually pointed to a graphics card failure or a sleep/wake issue.

See also
Fatal system error

References

External links

 Windows 7 black screen of death

Computer errors
Screens of death